Ascent is an American literary magazine that publishes stories, poems, and essays, many of which are later reprinted in annual anthologies.  The journal is based at Concordia College in Moorhead, Minnesota.

The journal was founded in 1975 at the University of Illinois by Daniel Curley.  In 1996, essayist and English scholar W. Scott Olsen became the editor-in-chief.  The journal moved to an online format in 2010, where it would reach a wider audience for its award-winning authors.

Recent notable contributors include Victoria Anderson, Jacob M. Appel, Karen Brown, Peter Chilson, Leo Damrosch, Philip Heldrich, Michael Martone, Sarah Baker Michalak and Marjorie Stelmach.

See also
List of literary magazines

Notes

External links
Ascent Web site

Defunct literary magazines published in the United States

American literature websites
Concordia College (Moorhead, Minnesota)
Magazines established in 1975
Magazines disestablished in 2010
Magazines published in Illinois
Magazines published in Minnesota
Online literary magazines published in the United States
Online magazines with defunct print editions